¡Asu mare! is a 2013 Peruvian biographical comedy film. It's a movie adaptation of the stand-up comedy show by the same name by Carlos Alcántara, starring himself. Directed by Ricardo Maldonado (in his directorial debut) and produced by Tondero Films, the film premiered on April 11, 2013 nationwide.

This film brings together most of the actors from the Peruvian sitcom Pataclaun (1997—99).

Plot 
The story follows the adventures of Carlos Alcántara on his way to fame from his childhood in the "Unidad Vecinal Mirones". It is a recreation of his youth and experiences with his mother.
In the beginning he explains how he started to admire music but later realized that he couldn't sing. So he later tried being an actor but got framed in the process. Later on he finds himself down on his luck but later a young boy who was a street performer gives him his clown nose and its from there that plans to get some acting lessons. Later he and a couple of close friends make a team known as Pataclaun that becomes a great hit in Peru. From there he gets to be well known around the country and gets fame. In the end he thanks his mom for all the support she gave him in the good and bad times.

Cast 
Carlos Alcántara as himself
Ana Cecilia Natteri as Isabel "Chabela" Vilar
Gisela Ponce de León as Isabel "Chabela" Vilar (young)
Emilia Drago as Emilia
Dayiro Castañeda as Carlos Alcántara (child)
Santiago Suárez as Carlos Alcántara (young)
Andrés Salas as Culicich
Anahí de Cárdenas as Emilia's friend
Franco Cabrera as Carlos's friend

Guest appearances 
Gisela Valcárcel as herself
Tatiana Astengo as Marujita
Carlos Carlín as janitor
Wendy Ramos as gypsy
Johanna San Miguel as Socorro
Gonzalo Torres as professor
Katia Condos as lady at the party

Other appearances 
Juan Manuel Ochoa as Monfu
Mario Velásquez as swindler
Carlos Cano as Carlos's uncle
Daniel Marquina as soldier
Jossie Lindley as Emilia's mom
Carolina Cano as girl at the beach
Ana Rosa Liendo as teacher
Carlos Cabrera as Ferrando
Katia Palma as Carlos's aunt

Box Office 
During the first week of May 14, 2013, the movie broke all time-records in Peru as the viewership increased to 2.34 million people compared to 2.31 million people from Ice Age 4 in 2012. It also broke records for the most viewers on opening day, and the fastest film to reach one million in ticket sales. It is the second highest grossing Peruvian film after The Motorcycle Diaries.

Sequel
A sequel, titled ¡Asu mare! 2 was released on April 9, 2015. Ricardo Maldonado returned as director and Carlos Alcántara returned as writer and the protagonist

References

External links 
 

2013 films
2013 comedy films
Peruvian biographical films
Peruvian comedy films
Tondero Producciones films
2010s Peruvian films
2010s Spanish-language films
Films about actors
Films about comedians
2013 directorial debut films